The Ciénaga Grande de Santa Marta (Spanish for Large Marsh of Saint Martha) is the largest of the swampy marshes located in Colombia between the Magdalena River and the Sierra Nevada de Santa Marta. It has an area of 4280 km2 and belongs to the outer delta system of the Madgalena River. It is separated from the Caribbean Sea by a narrow, sandy artificial spit built in the 1950s, on which is situated coastal route 90 from Barranquilla to Santa Marta. The marsh's large lagoon is connected to the Caribbean Sea via a narrow strait (the La Barra channel) located between the town of Pueblo Viejo and the city of Ciénaga.

References

External links
 UNESCO Biosphere Reserve information
  Colombia National Park system website
 At Coastal Wiki

Marshes of Colombia
Wetlands of Colombia
Geography of Magdalena Department
Biosphere reserves of Colombia
Ramsar sites in Colombia
Magdalena River
Sierra Nevada de Santa Marta